X, also known as X/1999 and X: The Movie, is a 1996 Japanese anime film directed by Rintaro and animated by Madhouse. Rintaro wrote it alongside Clamp head writer Nanase Ohkawa. It is based on Clamp's manga of the same name. It premiered August 3, 1996, in Japan and had a limited screening in North America during 2000. The supernatural thriller focuses on the roles Kamui Shiro, Kotori Monou, and Fuma Monou play in the Apocalypse. After his mother's death, the young Kamui returns to Tokyo to participate in a Holy War between two groups that will either protect mankind or protect nature at the cost of mankind.

Rintaro was approached by Kadokawa Shoten to direct this movie and found this part of his career unique due to how he work with Ohkawa, Clamp's head writer, while also aiming to show a self-contained story with a style and atmosphere that might be rejected by the viewers. The film's theme song is "Forever Love" by X Japan. The film was released in both VHS and DVD format.

Despite the popularity of the series, critical response to the film was mixed with critics praising the visuals and fight choreography, while the lack of focus on most of the cast supporting Kamui and Fuma was met with negative response. In retrospective, books focused on films still praised Rintaro's film while the television series produced years later by Madhouse was felt superior due to the further handling of the cast.

Plot
After his mother dies to create a "Sacred Sword" to seal it into his body, a young man named Kamui Shiro goes back to his hometown Tokyo to understand his fate. As he arrives, he learns of a current war between two factions known as the Dragons of the Heavens and the Dragons of the Earth who seek the survival of mankind and nature, respectively. Shortly after Kamui's arrival, Subaru Sumeragi from the Heavens and Seishirō Sakurazuka from the Earth kill each other, resulting in a moment in the destruction of part of the city. Kamui meets his childhood friends Fuma Monou and Kotori Monou whom he came back to protect, but he and Fuma start suffering visions when seeing each other. Kamui is then attacked by the Dragons of Earth but is saved by the ones from the Heavens. As this happens Kotori is kidnapped by a woman named Kanoe while Fuma follows her.

Kamui is contacted by Princess Hinoto, Kanoe's sister, who seeks to recruit Kamui into the Dragons of Heavens to protect mankind from this war. Kamui refuses to take such responsibility but remains concerned about Fuma and Kotori. Kanoe meets Fuma and recognizes him as the "other Kamui" who could replace the other and join the Dragons of Earth. Seichiro Aoki and Karen Kasumi from the Heavens face Nataku and Shōgo from the Earth respectively but all four fighters are murdered. Fearing Kotori and Fuma possibly being killed by the Dragons of Earth, Kamui joins the Dragons of Heavens alongside the members Arashi Kishū, Sorata Arisugawa and Yuzuriha Nekoi to face their Dragons of Earth. Upon meeting a man named Kusanagi Shiyū from the Earth, Kamui tries to get him to tell him Kotori and Fuma's whereabouts but he tries to kill him alongside Yuzuriha. As this happens, Kamui suffers visions again and Yuzuriha is killed in a battle with Yūto and Kusanagi while protecting Kamui. Fuma finds Kamui and murders Kusanagi alongside Yuto later on. 

Fuma then kills Kotori as her body contains another Sacred Sword to wield in the war. The continuous deaths of the Dragons of Heavens cause the destruction of more areas from Tokyo. Before dying from the falling debris, Hinoto transports Kamui to a safe area to protect mankind. Fuma then attempts to kill Kamui who is unwilling to fight his friend. Eventually, Kamui is forced to unseal his own Sacred Sword and decapitates Fuma. Despite being the winner of the war, Kamui is completely grief-stricken over what transpired and cries while holding Fuma's head in the remains of Tokyo.

Cast

Production

Rintaro directed the movie aimed. He was requested by the editorial Kadokawa Shoten due to unknown reasons, which he believes it was due to his work on Harmageddon, a 1983 film that employs different themes from the X manga. He aimed Asami Watanabi's script as a base to develop scenes of his liking. Based on the style he employed, Rintaro expected that multiple viewers would reject his work as the narrative gave Kamui a tragic ending which would impact people's personal taste. X was the first time Rintaro worked with Clamp which he found to be a unique experience. Since the manga was not finished, the script was made with Ohkawa's help to create a completely alternative story. He aimed the film to be a self-contained story and thus multiple subplots had to be removed from the source material. He often discussed this with Ohkawa who created the first script which Madhouse use to adapt. In retrospective, Rintaro is glad with how the movie was completed, specifically due to the focus on fight scenes. The film was written to be as simple as possible.

The characters were designed by Nobuteri Yuki while the music was produced by Yasuaki Shimizu. X was the first time Rintaro used computer animation in his career. The character Shogo Asagi was created exclusively to the movie. Kadokawa Shoten editor Seichiro Aoki supervised the movie which gave a large surprise when learning that one of the characters was modeled after him but written in different Japanese characters. His job was also making sure the characters were nearly identical to manga's original style. Meanwhile, Clamp were asked for help by Rintaro who wanted to properly dress Karen.

The film was given a limited release in the United States in early 2000 and released to VHS and DVD on September 25, 2001 by Manga Entertainment. X: The Destiny War, a comic book based on the feature film, was released on September 30, 1996. The X Japan song "Forever Love", composed by Yoshiki, was chosen as the film's theme song. "Forever Love" also appears on the soundtrack of the film.

The X  were released from June 1996 to December 1996 by Victor Entertainment. The seven audio dramas, scripted by Nanase Ohkawa, focus on the thoughts and motivations of the individual Dragons of Heaven and Earth. The Character Files are performed by the feature film voice actors. They were created to promote the film version of the manga.

Reception
Released on March 10, 2000 in the United States, the film reached $143,355 in the box office. The song "Forever Love" was later used by the former Japanese Prime Minister Junichiro Koizumi in a campaign advertisement in 2001. According to Anime News Network, X Japan became popular worldwide thanks to their contribution to the X movie. An alternate version of Shogo Asagi went to appear in Clamps manga Tsubasa: Reservoir Chronicle as a gang leader who often encounters the series' protagonist, Syaoran, in the first story arc.

The X movie is also notable to be the goriest adaptation of the manga, as, while television series is violent, it does not show massive genocide or decapitations like the film. Kamui is prophesied to return to Tokyo as one who will determine humanity's fate. The construction of Kamui as a messiah is reinforced by his miraculous birth and given name; "Kamui", like "Christ", alludes to the character's divine nature. Bamboo Dong from Anime News Network praised the Japanese cast, pointing out the lead Tomokazu Seki's role voicing Kamui due to how he displays the character's emotions. Dong considered it as "technical masterpiece", but lacking plot and character development. AnimeOnDVD writer Chris Beveridge praised the dialogue and audio provided by the English release. The felt that the dilemma between Kamui and Fuma being friends turned enemies was the most notable aspect of the narrative. However, he noted that the film was primarily a battle film and thus felt the plot was "empty" something he further noted during Rintaro's interview shown in the DVD. As a result, he awarded the DVD a "B+" THEM Anime Reviews called it a poor adaptation of Clamp's manga as while the concept of a war destined to decide the planet's fate was interesting, it was difficult to care for the characters, based on the fact almost everybody is killed in the process, regardless of well coordinated battles. As a result, THEM gave the film three stars out of five and recommended the viewers to skip it and instead watch the television series. Animerica was more positive by how the drama focused on Kamui, Fuma and Kotori, finding it intense. He went to refer to it as a "surreal movie experience for both fans of the manga and those who have no idea what to expect." In comparison to the film, Zac Bertschy from ANN felt that Fuma's transformation into the series' villain is more realistic in the television series.

In CLAMP in Context: A Critical Study of the Manga and Anime, the film's surreal scenes were noted to be one of the strongest aspects as the television series would instead develop expositions instead. The book also praised that while film lacked content for the supporting cast, it still managed to focus on the main trio, Kamui, Kotori and Fuma. In the book Animation: A World History: Volume III: Contemporary Times, Giannalberto Bendazzi regarded X as one of Rintaro's "outstanding" works based on the visual presentations he created. Even though the abbreviated story fails to place the characters' action in the proper context, the film is praised for its dreamlike atmosphere, powerful imagery and visually engaging action sequences. Despite agreeing with other critics in the problems with the film, the book Anime Classics Zettai!: 100 Must-See Japanese Animation Masterpieces noted that both the feature and television series provided attractive adaptations of Clamp's manga, with the film achieving an appealing atmosphere based the combination of animation and music while complimenting the character designs. The New York Times compared the film's animation to that of other popular anime like Princess Mononoke (1997), Ghost in the Shell (1995) and Akira (1988) despite stressing the amount of concentration needed to follow the narrative.

References

External links

 
 

1996 films
1996 action thriller films
1996 anime films
1990s fantasy action films
1990s supernatural thriller films
Action anime and manga
Anime films based on manga
Apocalyptic anime and manga
Dark fantasy anime and manga
Films directed by Rintaro
Films set in 1999
Madhouse (company)
Manga Entertainment
Japanese dark fantasy films
Supernatural thriller anime and manga
Toei Company films
X/1999
Works by Clamp (manga artists)